The 41st Bombardment Wing is an inactive United States Air Force unit. Its last assignment was with Eighth Air Force, based at RAF Molesworth, England. It was inactivated on 18 June 1945.

History
The wing was a Boeing B-17 Flying Fortress heavy bomber command and control organization for VIII Bomber Command in England. Its subordinate units were engaged in the strategic air campaign against Germany.  Air Offensive, Europe; Normandy; Northern France; Rhineland; Ardennes-Alsace; Central Europe.

The wing was constituted as the 41st Bombardment Wing (Heavy) on 29 January 1943 and activated on 16 February 1943. In August 1943 it was redesignated 41st Combat Bombardment Wing (Heavy).

The wing was disbanded on 18 June 1945.

Assignments
 Second Air Force, 16 February 1943
 VIII Bomber Command, 26 July 1943
 Redesignated: Eighth Air Force, 22 February 1944-18 June 1945

Units assigned
 303d Bombardment Group (RAF Molesworth): 13 September 1943 – 11 June 1945 
 379th Bombardment Group (RAF Kimbolton): 13 September 1943 – 12 July 1945 
 384th Bombardment Group (RAF Grafton Underwood): 13 September 1943 – 16 June 1945.

Stations
 Salt Lake City Army Air Base, Utah, 16 February 1943
 Rapid City Army Air Base, South Dakota, March-c. 4 July 1943
 Brampton Grange (AAF-103), England, c. 26 July 1943
 RAF Molesworth (AAF-107), England, c. 16 September 1943 – 18 June 1945

References

 Maurer, Maurer (1983). Air Force Combat Units Of World War II. Maxwell AFB, Alabama: Office of Air Force History. .

External links

Military units and formations established in 1943
041